Giovanni Macchia (14 November 1912 -  30 September 2001) was an Italian literary critic and essayist.

Born in Trani, the son of a magistrate, in 1923 Macchia moved with his family to Rome, where in 1934 he graduated in letters and philosophy with a thesis on Charles Baudelaire as a critic, a topic which was later one of his main subject of studies. He attended  master classes at the Collège de France and at La Sorbonne. 

Starting from 1938 he was lecturer of French letters and literature at the University of Pisa, at the University of Catania and at La Sapienza in Rome, where he also founded and directed the Institute of history of the theater and performing arts.
 
His essay about Marcel Proust,  L'angelo della notte, got him a Bagutta Prize in 1979. Other main subjects of his analysis include the European theatre, the French moralists, and the Age of Enlightenment.

A member of the Accademia dei Lincei since 1962, in 1990 he was awarded the Legion of Honor. In 1992 he received a Balzan Prize.

References
 

1912 births
2001 deaths
People from Trani
Italian literary critics
Recipients of the Legion of Honour
Sapienza University of Rome alumni
Academic staff of the Sapienza University of Rome
Academic staff of the University of Pisa
Academic staff of the University of Catania